Andrés González (1634 – February 14, 1709) was a Roman Catholic prelate who served as Bishop of Nueva Caceres (1685–1709).

Biography
Andrés González was born in Villar de Frades, Spain and ordained a priest in the Order of Preachers. On September 10, 1685, Pope Innocent XI, appointed him Bishop of Nueva Caceres. In 1686, he was consecrated bishop by Felipe Fernandez de Pardo, Archbishop of Manila with Diego de Aguilar,  Bishop of Cebu and Ginés Barrientos, Auxiliary Bishop of Manila as Co-Consecrators. He served as Bishop of Nueva Caceres until his death on February 14, 1709. Prior to becoming bishop, he assisted in the consecration of Felipe Fernandez de Pardo, Archbishop of Manila.

References

External links and additional sources
 (for Chronology of Bishops) 
 (for Chronology of Bishops) 

1634 births
1709 deaths
Dominican bishops
Bishops appointed by Pope Innocent XI
17th-century Roman Catholic bishops in the Philippines
18th-century Roman Catholic bishops in the Philippines
Roman Catholic bishops of Cáceres